The River Okement is a tributary of the River Torridge in Devon, England.  It used to be known as the River Ock.

It rises at two places in Dartmoor, as the West Okement and the East Okement. These meet with other minor streams and join together at Okehampton.  The river flows generally north, past the villages of Jacobstowe and Monkokehampton, and has its confluence with the River Torridge near Meeth.

Transport 

The river (West Okement) is crossed by the Meldon Viaduct of the now-closed North Cornwall Railway.

References

External links

Ockment
Ockment
1Okement